Bulbophyllum remiferum is a species of orchid in the genus Bulbophyllum.

References

External links
 The Bulbophyllum-Checklist
 Photo of Bulbophyllum remiferum in situ from Orchids of Sumatra

remiferum